Senator Bird may refer to:

Claire B. Bird (1868–1954), Wisconsin State Senate
Harlan P. Bird (1838–1912), Wisconsin State Senate
Lester Bird (1938–2021), Senate of Antigua and Barbuda
Lloyd C. Bird (1894–1978), Virginia State Senate
Michael Bird (politician) (born c. 1930), Colorado State Senate

See also
Senator Byrd (disambiguation)